Hilvare is a village in the Karmala taluka of Solapur district in Maharashtra state, India.

Demographics
Covering  and comprising 359 households at the time of the 2011 census of India, Hilvare had a population of 1425. There were 748 males and 677 females, with 192 people being aged six or younger.

References

Villages in Karmala taluka